The Aristifats Diatreme is a diatreme in the Northwest Territories, Canada, located about  east of Yellowknife. It is thought to have formed about 1850 million years ago with the eruption of pyroclastic breccia.

See also
List of volcanoes in Canada
Volcanology of Canada
Volcanology of Northern Canada

References

Diatremes of the Northwest Territories
Proterozoic volcanoes